Usha Lee McFarling is an American science reporter who is an Artist In Residence at the University of Washington Department of Communication. She won a 2007 Pulitzer Prize for Explanatory Reporting.

Biography
McFarling was born in Germany to an Air Force family. She attended elementary school in Los Angeles. McFarling received a B.A. in biology from Brown University in 1989 (where she was a science reporter for the Brown Daily Herald) and an M.A. in biological psychology/animal behavior from the University of California, Berkeley in 1998. McFarling reported for Knight Ridder Washington Bureau, Boston Globe, and San Antonio Light prior to joining the Los Angeles Times, where she was a national science reporter. McFarling has reported on a wide variety of science news, including topics such as astrophysics, seismology, neuroscience, medicine, and climate change.

McFarling was a 1992 Knight Science Journalism Fellow at Massachusetts Institute of Technology (MIT). McFarling and fellow reporter Kenneth R. Weiss won several prizes for their five-part series "Altered Oceans" for the Los Angeles Times, including (with photojournalist Rick Loomis) the 2007 Pulitzer Prize for Explanatory Reporting for the same pieces. The citation read: "for their richly portrayed reports on the world's distressed oceans, telling the story in print and online, and stirring reaction among readers and officials." For the same series, McFarling and Weiss received the 2006 George Polk Award for Environmental Reporting, the 2007 Grantham Prize of the Grantham Foundation for the Protection of the Environment, the 2007 American Geophysical Union Walter Sullivan Award for Excellence in Science Journalism the 2007 Carl Sagan Award for Public Understanding of Science, and the National Association of Science Writers Science in Society Award.

References

External links
Profile from the University of Washington Department of Communication
"Altered Oceans" - five-part Los Angeles Times series on the state of the world's oceans

Living people
University of Washington faculty
Brown University alumni
University of California, Berkeley alumni
American women journalists
American science journalists
George Polk Award recipients
Pulitzer Prize for Explanatory Journalism winners
Women science writers
Year of birth missing (living people)
American women academics
21st-century American women